Karla Maria Henriëtte Peijs (born 1 September 1944) is a retired Dutch politician of the Christian Democratic Appeal (CDA).

References

External links

Official
  Drs. K.M.H. (Karla) Peijs Parlement & Politiek

 

 
 

1944 births
Living people
Christian Democratic Appeal MEPs
Christian Democratic Appeal politicians
Dutch corporate directors
Dutch nonprofit directors
Dutch nonprofit executives
King's and Queen's Commissioners of Zeeland
MEPs for the Netherlands 1989–1994
MEPs for the Netherlands 1994–1999
MEPs for the Netherlands 1999–2004
20th-century women MEPs for the Netherlands
21st-century women MEPs for the Netherlands
Members of the Provincial Council of Utrecht
Ministers of Transport and Water Management of the Netherlands
Ministers of Housing and Spatial Planning of the Netherlands
Officers of the Order of Orange-Nassau
People from Middelburg, Zeeland
People from Tilburg
Politicians from Utrecht (city)
Radboud University Nijmegen alumni
Vrije Universiteit Amsterdam alumni
Women government ministers of the Netherlands
20th-century Dutch educators
20th-century Dutch politicians
21st-century Dutch politicians
Women King's and Queen's Commissioners of the Netherlands